Suzanne Lacasse  (born in Rouyn-Noranda on September 22, 1948, Québec, Canada) is a Canadian civil engineer. She obtained her PhD in 1976.

Biography 

In 1967, she obtained a  Bachelor of Arts from the University of Montreal.

From 1991 until 2011, she was the managing director of the Norwegian Geotechnical Institute.

Awards and recognition 
In 2001, Lacasse was elected as a member into the National Academy of Engineering for enlightened direction of the Norwegian Geotechnical Institute and for advancements in foundation engineering for offshore structures. She was the 2015 Rankine Lecturer, and she has received honorary doctorates from the Norwegian University of Science and Technology and from the University of Dundee.
She is also a member of the Royal Norwegian Society of Sciences and Letters.
She was the 2019 winner of the Sir John Kennedy Medal of the Engineering Institute of Canada. In 2018 she was named an Officer of the Order of Canada by the Governor General of Canada.

References 

1948 births
Living people
Canadian civil engineers
Canadian women engineers
Officers of the Order of Canada
20th-century women engineers
21st-century women engineers
Royal Norwegian Society of Sciences and Letters